The Deer and the Cauldron, also known as The Duke of Mount Deer, is a historical comedy novel by Jin Yong (Louis Cha). Although it is the longest of his novels and the last to be published, it is the eighth in chronological order. It was initially published in Hong Kong as a serial, running from 24 October 1969 to 23 September 1972 in the newspaper Ming Pao.

Although the book is often called a wuxia novel, it is not quite typical of the genre: the protagonist, Wei Xiaobao, is not an adept martial artist, but rather an antihero who relies on wit and cunning to get out of trouble.

Title 
The novel's title is explained in the first chapter when the poet Lü Liuliang discusses two concepts with his son. The cauldron is a reference to a story in the Zuo Zhuan in which King Zhuang of Chu enquired the weight of the Nine Tripod Cauldrons – revealing his secret desire to seize the Mandate of Heaven. The deer is a reference to a remark by Kuai Tong recorded in the Records of the Grand Historian: "the Qin emperor lost his deer, and all under heaven chased after it". The deer symbolises the common people of China, who are at the mercy of ruthless warlords vying to conquer the lands of the fallen Qin dynasty.

The title indicates one of the major themes of the novel, the struggle of Han Chinese supporters of the fallen Ming dynasty to free China from the rule of the invading Manchu-led Qing dynasty.

In the afterword, Jin Yong wrote that his intention in writing the novel was to reflect societal and cultural realities instead of encouraging readers to imitate a cunning and evil protagonist. He considered modifying the ending to make Wei Xiaobao get his just deserts, but dropped the idea and retained the original ending after receiving negative feedback from readers.

Plot 
The story centres on a witty, sly, illiterate and lazy protagonist, Wei Xiaobao, who was born in a brothel in Yangzhou in the mid-17th century during the early Qing dynasty. By chance, the teenage scamp helps an outlaw evade the authorities and follows him to Beijing, the imperial capital. In Beijing, he is kidnapped and taken to the imperial palace, where he impersonates an eunuch. While in the palace, Wei Xiaobao bumbles his way into a fateful encounter with the young Kangxi Emperor, the ruler of the Qing Empire, and strikes up a friendship with him.

One day, Wei Xiaobao encounters the Tiandihui ("Heaven and Earth Society"), a secret society aiming to overthrow the Qing dynasty. He impresses Chen Jinnan, the Tiandihui's leader, who takes him in as an apprentice. Besides, he also becomes one of the Tiandihui's lodge leaders and agrees to serve as their spy in the palace. Later, he is taken captive by the sinister Mystic Dragon Cult and brought to the island where they are based. Through glib talk and flattery, he wins the favour of Hong Antong, the cult leader, and becomes one of the cult's five emissaries.

Wei Xiaobao makes a number of seemingly impossible achievements through sheer luck, cunning, and the use of unglamorous means such as cheating and deception. First, he assists the Kangxi Emperor in ousting the autocratic regent, Oboi, from power. Second, he discovers the whereabouts of the missing Shunzhi Emperor, who has been presumed dead, saves him from danger and reunites him with his son, the Kangxi Emperor. Third, he eliminates the Mystic Dragon Cult by stirring up internal conflict, which leads to the cult's self-destruction. Fourth, he weakens Wu Sangui's rebellion by bribing the rebels' allies to withdraw, allowing Qing imperial forces to crush the rebels easily. Finally, he leads a campaign against the Tsardom of Russia and helps the Qing Empire reach a border treaty with the Russians. Earlier on, he had met the Russian regent, Sophia Alekseyevna, and helped her consolidate control over Russia during an uprising. In the process of accomplishing these tasks, he also recommended talents to serve the Qing government, one of whom is Shi Lang, the admiral who led the successful naval campaign against the Kingdom of Tungning in Taiwan.

Throughout the story, Wei Xiaobao exhibits devout loyalty to both the Kangxi Emperor and his friends in the Tiandihui and other anti-Qing forces. He instinctively shields the emperor with his body from assassins and saves the emperor's life on two occasions, in addition to playing an important role in assisting the Kangxi Emperor in consolidating power. On the other hand, he secretly helps the anti-Qing forces escape on numerous occasions and undermines attempts by Qing imperial forces to destroy the Tiandihui. For his achievements, he is rewarded with immense wealth and titles of nobility. The highest position he reached is "Duke of Deer Cauldron" (or "Duke of Mount Deer", which is used as an alternative English title for the novel). He earns the respect of the anti-Qing forces for eliminating corrupt officials and defending China from foreign invasion. On top of his achievements, he also encounters seven attractive women on separate occasions, flirts and toys with them, and eventually marries all seven of them.

Wei Xiaobao's conflicting loyalties ultimately reach a disastrous conclusion. The Kangxi Emperor discovers his relationship with the Tiandihui, and forces him to choose to either remain loyal to the Qing Empire or become an enemy of the state. Wei Xiaobao faces a dilemma: If he chooses to follow the emperor's orders, he will have to betray his friends in the Tiandihui and help the emperor destroy them; if he refuses, he faces the possibility of death and the extermination of his family. Although he ultimately chooses to go into exile, the emperor still regards him as a close friend and loyal subject so he pardons him and allows him to return to the palace later.

Towards the end of the novel, the Kangxi Emperor tries to force Wei Xiaobao to help him eliminate the Tiandihui again. On the other hand, Wei Xiaobao faces an even bigger problem with the Tiandihui. As Chen Jinnan had died recently, the Tiandihui's members look up to Wei Xiaobao and want him to be their new leader.

Wei Xiaobao ponders the issue, realises that he will never be able to reconcile between the two opposing sides, and feels that his divided friendships and split loyalties are tearing him apart. He decides to leave and lead a reclusive life, and brings along his family and immense wealth with him. He is never seen again. It is said that when the Kangxi Emperor went on six inspection tours to the Jiangnan region throughout his reign, his true purpose was to search for Wei Xiaobao.

Characters

Miscellaneous information

Sutra of Forty-two Chapters 
The founders of the Manchu-led Qing dynasty made eight copies of the Sutra of Forty-two Chapters, a classical Buddhist text. After the Qing forces conquered the Central Plains, they looted large amounts of treasure and transported them to a secret location in northeast China. The map to that location was torn into several pieces and hidden in the eight books separately. Each book was given to one of the Eight Banners for safekeeping.

To protect the treasure, the Eight Banners' commanders were not told about the treasure vault. Instead, they were told that the books contained a secret leading to a location containing the "root" of the Qing imperial bloodline, the Dragon's Pulse. If this "root" is disturbed, it will end the fortunes of the Manchus. This is to ensure that none of the nobles will attempt to find this location; they will instead guard the secret with their lives. Only the emperor knows the truth, as evident when the Shunzhi Emperor passes on this knowledge to the Kangxi Emperor.

The books are sought by many, including Hai Dafu, Mao Dongzhu, the Mystic Dragon Cult, the Heaven and Earth Society, the former Princess Changping, Wu Sangui and others. Some of them know the truth about the treasure while others wish to end the Qing dynasty by destroying the Manchu "root". Wei Xiaobao collects the eight books and pieces the map together. He finds the treasure at Mount Deer Cauldron in Heilongjiang, but does not seize it for himself because he holds on to the belief that the treasure is the Qing imperial family's "root".

The eight books

Literary inquisition 

In the early years of the reign of the Kangxi Emperor, the regent Oboi monopolised state power and introduced the practice of literary inquisition. Many intellectuals and scholars were persecuted for their writings. Zhuang Tinglong, a merchant from Huzhou, sponsored the publication of an unauthorised book about the history of the Ming dynasty. The book used the Ming emperors' era names, which were considered taboo in the Qing dynasty. Wu Zhirong found out and reported it to the authorities.

Zhuang Tinglong and his family were persecuted and the male members of the Zhuang family were killed. The incident also sparked off a chain reaction, in which several individuals who were not directly involved or linked to the book were similarly rounded up and executed. These individuals included scholars who helped to write and proofread the book, bookstore owners who sold copies of the book, distant relatives of the Zhuang family, and even people who had contact with readers of the book.

Reception 
The Deer and the Cauldron, even among fans of Jin Yong's novels, has divided critical opinion mainly due to the character of Wei Xiaobao. Ni Kuang argued that The Deer and the Cauldron was "the best novel of all time, Chinese or foreign". Wong Kwok-pun of the Chinese University of Hong Kong felt that it was an inferior work compared to the "masterpieces" of the Condor Trilogy and expressed surprise that John Minford chose to translate an abridged version of it.

English language translation 
The Deer and the Cauldron has been translated in highly abridged form (28 chapters) into English by John Minford and David Hawkes. The translation was published by the Oxford University Press in three volumes from 1997 to 2002.

Works based on the novel 
There are books which examine the office politics displayed by the main characters and their applications in real life.
Qingjing Luding Ji (情境鹿鼎记), 
Zongcai Wei Xiaobao (总裁韦小宝; Wei Xiaobao the CEO), 
Poyi Wei Xiaobao (破译韦小宝; Interpreting Wei Xiaobao), 
Chuankao Wei Xiaobao (串烤韦小宝), 
Renjing Wei Xiaobao De Hunshi Fabao (人精韦小宝的混世法宝)

Adaptations

Films

Television

Radio 
In 2000, Hong Kong's RTHK broadcast a 100 episodes radio drama based on the novel, with Eason Chan and Roland Leung voicing Wei Xiaobao and the Kangxi Emperor respectively.

Video games 
 Role-playing video games:
 鹿鼎記 (智冠) (DOS) (Traditional Chinese)
 鹿鼎記 (歡樂盒)
 鹿鼎記II
 Heroes of Jin Yong Online (金庸群侠传 Online)
 Java ME games for mobile phones:
 情圣韦小宝
 韦小宝笑传

References 

 
1969 novels
Novels by Jin Yong
Novels first published in serial form
Works originally published in Ming Pao
Novels set in the Qing dynasty
Novels set in the 17th century
Chinese novels adapted into television series
Shun dynasty
Novels set in Yunnan